Sergio Wielzen (born November 1, 1987 in Suriname) is a Surinamese-Dutch super lightweight Muay Thai kickboxer formerly fighting out of Amsterdam, Netherlands for Black Label and FF Carbin. Medio 2015 he switched to Sityodtong Muay Thai & Kickboxing Amsterdam to be trained by Paul and Vincent Pengel. His nickname is "Samurai" in English. Despite his deceptively small stature he is known for his explosive power - having won many of his fights by KO or TKO.  He is the former (and first ever) It's Showtime 61MAX world champion as well as the current Lion Fight Muay Thai world lightweight champion

Biography and Career

Born in Suriname, Sergio moved to the Netherlands where he became involved in the Dutch national Muay Thai scene beginning his career at C-Class. An explosive fighter despite his short stature, Sergio worked his way up through the ranks finishing many of his opponents and was becoming noticed as one of the top young prospects at -61 kg in the Netherlands.  In 2007 he met fellow up and coming fighter, Mohammed 'Mootje' Kamal, coming out on top in what would be the biggest victory in his career up to that point, winning by decision after five rounds in their B-Class clash.  The two would meet again in a re-match the following year, this time at A-Class level.  Although Sergio suffered a TKO defeat, he also proved that he had an excellent chin fighting against a great boxer, puncher before Sergio Wielzen didn.t came out of his corner in the fourth.

Sergio would truly emerge on the international scene in 2010 when he faced Thai legend Anuwat Kaewsamrit in Geneva, Switzerland.  In a match he was considered a clear underdog, Sergio shocked the Muay Thai world by knocking out the 'Iron Hands of Siam' via a vicious head kick after just 30 seconds.  Due to his results on the local scene – including winning the U.M.C. Contender title against Imed Boukouayel - Sergio would become involved with the It's Showtime organization, making his debut in Milan and defeating local fighter Matteo Lippi by knockout.

Towards the end of 2010, Sergio was called up to face Frenchman Mikael Peynaud for the first ever It's Showtime 61MAX world title.  The fight had some controversy as the match was stopped in the second round after a clash of heads left Peynaud with a cut.  Unable to continue, the fight went to the judge's scorecard, resulting in a technical decision victory for the Surinamese fighter in his home town of Amsterdam.  In December of that year, Sergio was back in action, defending his world title after two months against Japanese K-1 fighter Masahiro Yamamoto in Athens.  This title fight was much more clear cut than the first with Sergio winning by TKO in what was a commanding performance.  In March 2011, Sergio defended his It's Showtime world title once again but was unable to retain his crown, losing by majority decision after five rounds to Karim Bennoui at the event in Brussels.

He lost to Emerson Falcao via unanimous decision at It's Showtime 60 in São Paulo, Brazil on November 10, 2012.

Wielzen got his first win of the year when he knocked out Saša Jovanović in round one at Vendetta VI in Vienna, Austria on December 8, 2012.

He knocked out Alexei Blinov in the first round at Era of Champions in Cheboksary, Russia on March 14, 2013.

He lost a wide unanimous decision to former Lumpinee Stadium champion Kaoponlek after being floored in round one at Glory 7: Milan in Milan, Italy on April 20, 2013.

Wielzen rematched Masahiro Yamamoto at RISE 94 in Tokyo, Japan on July 20, 2013 and fell victim to a second round high kick from the Japanese fighter.

Wielzen competed at the -65 kg/143 lb Thai Max tournament in Meyreul, France on October 19, 2013, defeating Mickael Peynaud by first-round KO in the quarter-finals before losing to Houcine Bennoui by unanimous decision in the semis.

Titles
2016 Lion Fight Lightweight Champion
2014 W5 World Champion -60 kg 
2011 W5 World Champion -60 kg 
2010-11 It's Showtime World Champion -61 kg (1 title defence)
2010 U.M.C. Contender title -61.23  kg

Kickboxing record 

|-
|-  bgcolor="#FFBBBB"
| 2018-09-22|| Loss ||align=left|  Rodtang Jitmuangnon   || ONE Championship: Conquest of Heroes || Jakarta, Indonesia ||Decision (Unanimous) || 3 || 3:00
|-
|-  bgcolor="#FFBBBB"
| 2018-05-18|| Loss ||align=left|  Sam-A Gaiyanghadao   || ONE Championship: Unstoppable Dreams || Kallang, Singapore || KO (Right Elbow) || 4 || 2:47
|-
! style=background:white colspan=9 |
|-
|-  bgcolor="#FFBBBB"
| 2017-02-18 || Loss ||align=left| Timur Nadrov || W5 Grand Prix KITEK XXXIX || Moscow, Russia || TKO (Referee Stoppage/Right Hook) || 2 || 
|-
! style=background:white colspan=9 |
|-  bgcolor="#CCFFCC"
| 2017-01-13 || Win ||align=left| Li Ning || Glory of Heroes 6 || Jiyuan, Henan, China || Decision (Unanimous) || 3 || 3:00
|-
|-  bgcolor="#FFBBBB"
| 2016-12-03 || Loss ||align=left| Wang Wenfeng || Mix Fight Gala 20 || Germany || Decision || 3 || 3:00
|-
|-  bgcolor="#FFBBBB"
| 2016-10-29 || Loss ||align=left| Daniel Puertas Gallardo || KO Fighters 2 || Spain || Decision || 3 || 3:00
|-
|-  bgcolor="#CCFFCC"
| 2016-07-23 || Win ||align=left| Ba Gei|| FF Fighting Championship || Shenzhen, China || KO || 2 || 1:25
|-
|-  bgcolor="#CCFFCC"
| 2016-07-09 || Win ||align=left| Arthur Meyer || Lion Fight 30 || Mashantucket, Connecticut, United States || Decision (split)|| 5 || 3:00
|-
|-  bgcolor="#FFBBBB"
| 2016-05-07 || Loss ||align=left| Yun Qi || Glory of Heroes 2 || Shenzhen, China || Decision || 3 || 3:00
|-
|-  bgcolor="#CCFFCC"
| 2016-02-27 || Win ||align=left| Ognjen Topic || Lion Fight 28 || Mashantucket, Connecticut, United States || TKO (doctor stoppage)|| 3 || 0:50
|-
! style=background:white colspan=9 |
|-
|-  bgcolor="#CCFFCC"
| 2015-10-24|| Win ||align=left| Kong Long || KF1 WLF Intercontinental Super-4 Final || Hong Kong || KO || 2 || 
|-
! style=background:white colspan=9 |
|-  bgcolor="#CCFFCC"
| 2015-10-24|| Win ||align=left| Chin Ngai Chung || KF1 WLF Intercontinental Super-4 Semi-final  || Hong Kong || KO || 1 || 
|-
|-  bgcolor="#FFBBBB"
| 2015-09-27 || Loss ||align=left| Yakub Bersanukayev || ACB KB 2: Grand Prix Semifinals || Vityazevo, Krasnodar Krai, Russia || Decision (unanimous)|| 3 || 3:00
|-
|-  bgcolor="#CCFFCC"
| 2015-07-04 || Win ||align=left| Jin Ying ||  || China || KO || 2 || 
|-
|-  bgcolor="#FFBBBB"
| 2015-04-04 || Loss ||align=left| Deng Zeqi || Wu Lin Feng || China || TKO (doctor stoppage)|| 2 || 1:38
|-
|-  bgcolor="#CCFFCC"
| 2014-11-29 || Win ||align=left| Vitaly Lisnyak || W5 Crossroad of Times, Semi Finals || Bratislava, Slovakia || Decision || 3 || 3:00
|-
! style=background:white colspan=9 |
|-
|-  bgcolor="#CCFFCC"
| 2014-11-29 || Win ||align=left| Kittipong Pongthong || W5 Crossroad of Times, Semi Finals || Bratislava, Slovakia || Decision || 3 || 3:00
|-
|-  bgcolor="#FFBBBB"
| 2014-05-10 || Loss ||align=left| Charles François || King of the Ring 3 || Longeville-Lès-Metz, France || Decision || 3 || 3:00
|-
|-  bgcolor=#fbb
| 2014-01-25 || Loss||align=left| Hamza Essalih || Enfusion Fighting Rookies || Antwerp, Belgium || Ext.R Decision|| 4 || 3:00
|-  bgcolor="#FFBBBB"
| 2013-10-19 || Loss ||align=left| Houcine Bennoui || Thai Max, Semi Finals || Meyreuil, France || Decision (unanimous) || 3 || 3:00
|-
|-  bgcolor="#CCFFCC"
| 2013-10-19 || Win ||align=left| Mickael Peynaud || Thai Max, Quarter Finals || Meyreuil, France || KO || 1 || 
|-
|-  bgcolor="#FFBBBB"
| 2013-07-20 || Loss ||align=left| Masahiro Yamamoto || RISE 94 || Tokyo, Japan || KO (left high kick) || 2 || 1:36
|-
|-  bgcolor="#FFBBBB"
| 2013-04-20 || Loss ||align=left| Sak Kaoponlek || Glory 7: Milan || Milan, Italy || Decision (unanimous) || 3 || 3:00
|-
|-  bgcolor="#CCFFCC"
| 2013-03-14 || Win ||align=left| Alexei Blinov || Era of Champions || Cheboksary, Chuvashia, Russia || KO || 1 || 
|-
|-  bgcolor="#CCFFCC"
| 2012-12-08 || Win ||align=left| Saša Jovanović || Vendetta VI || Vienna, Austria || KO (left hook) || 1 || 
|-
|-  bgcolor="#FFBBBB"
| 2012-11-10 || Loss ||align=left| Emerson Falcão || It's Showtime 60 || São Paulo, Brazil || Decision (unanimous) || 3 || 3:00
|-
|-  bgcolor="#FFBBBB"
| 2012-08-19 || Loss ||align=left| Saeksan Or. Kwanmuang || Muay Thai Warriors || China || KO (elbow) || 3 || 
|-
! style=background:white colspan=9 |
|-
|-  bgcolor="#FFBBBB"
| 2011-11-23 || Loss ||align=left| Kosuke Komiyama || RISE 85 || Tokyo, Japan || TKO (Cut) || 1 || 2:08
|-  bgcolor="#CCFFCC"
| 2011-11-12 || Win ||align=left| Carlos Reyes || Street Culture, Fight Club Group & Canary Kickboxing Federation presents: It’s Showtime 53 || Tenerife, Spain || TKO (Cut) || 1 || 
|-  bgcolor="#CCFFCC"
| 2011-10-22 || Win ||align=left| Ruslan Tozliyan || W5 Grand Prix Moscow|| Moscow, Russia || Decision (Unanimous) || 5 || 3:00
|-
! style=background:white colspan=9 |
|-
|-  bgcolor="#FFBBBB"
| 2011-03-26 || Loss ||align=left| Karim Bennoui || BFN Group presents: It's Showtime Brussels || Brussels, Belgium || Decision (Split) || 5 || 3:00
|-
! style=background:white colspan=9 |
|-
|-  bgcolor="#CCFFCC"
| 2010-12-11 || Win ||align=left| Masahiro Yamamoto || Yiannis Evgenikos presents: It’s Showtime Athens || Athens, Greece || TKO (Doctor Stoppage) || 3 || 
|-
! style=background:white colspan=9 |
|-
|-  bgcolor="#CCFFCC"
| 2010-09-12 || Win ||align=left| Mikael Peynaud || Fightingstars presents: It's Showtime 2010 || Amsterdam, Netherlands || Technical Decision (5-0) || 2 || 
|-
! style=background:white colspan=9 |
|-
|-  bgcolor="#CCFFCC"
| 2010-05-29 || Win ||align=left| Anuwat Kaewsamrit || Muaythai event in Geneva || Geneva, Switzerland || KO (Right High Kick) || 1 || 0:30
|-
|-  bgcolor="#CCFFCC"
| 2010-03-13 || Win ||align=left| Matteo Lippi || Oktagon presents: It's Showtime 2010 || Milan, Italy || KO || 3 || 
|-
|-  bgcolor="#CCFFCC"
| 2010-01-24 || Win ||align=left| Imed Boukouayel || Beatdown || Amsterdam, Netherlands || TKO || 3 ||
|-
! style=background:white colspan=9 |
|-
|-  bgcolor="#CCFFCC"
| 2009-11-21 || Win ||align=left| Gary Hamilton || It's Showtime 2009 Barneveld || Barneveld, Netherlands || Decision || 3 || 3:00 
|-
|-  bgcolor="#FFBBBB"
| 2009-10-04 || Loss ||align=left| Delon Carilo || Ring Rage III || Groningen, Netherlands || Decision || 5 || 3:00
|-
|-  bgcolor="#CCFFCC"
| 2009-03-08 || Win ||align=left| Mohammed Ettajiri || Beatdown || Amsterdam, Netherlands || KO (Knee) || 1 ||
|-
|-  bgcolor="#CCFFCC"
| 2009-02-01 || Win ||align=left| Rachid El Majoubi || Time For Action || Nijmegen, Netherlands || TKO (Doctor Stoppage) || 1 ||
|-
|-  bgcolor="#FFBBBB"
| 2008-11-08 || Loss ||align=left| Mohammed Khamal || Ice Cold Assassins || Amsterdam, Netherlands || TKO || 4 ||
|-
|-  bgcolor="#FFBBBB"
| 2008-05-31 || Loss ||align=left| Delon Carrilho || Enriching Suriname || Paramaribo, Suriname || Decision || 5 || 3:00
|-
|-  bgcolor="#c5d2ea"
| 2008-02-02 || Draw ||align=left| Mo Aljedyan || Beatdown IX, Zonnehuis || Amsterdam, Netherlands || Decision draw || 5 || 2:00
|-  bgcolor="#CCFFCC"
| 2007-11-03 || Win ||align=left| Mohammed Khamal || Beatdown VIII || Amsterdam, Netherlands || Decision (Unanimous) || 5 || 2:00
|-
|-  bgcolor="#CCFFCC"
| 2007-07-21 || Win ||align=left| Stacy Hassell || Surinam Be Innovative || Suriname || KO || 2 || 
|-
|-  bgcolor="#CCFFCC"
| 2007-05-12 || Win ||align=left| Bilal Aoulad Si Oomar || Muaythai Gala "Talents of Osdorp", Sporthal Ookmeer || Amsterdam, Netherlands || Decision (Unanimous) || 5 || 2:00
|-  bgcolor="#c5d2ea"
| 2007-04-29 || NC ||align=left| Mimoun Boughdir || Beatdown V, Wethouder Verheijhal Sporthal|| Amsterdam, Netherlands || No contest || 1 || 
|-  bgcolor="#CCFFCC"
| 2007-03-31 || Win ||align=left| Suleyman Kasmi ||  || Middelburg, Netherlands || TKO (Referee stoppage) || 3 || 
|-  bgcolor="#CCFFCC"
| 2007-03-18 || Win ||align=left| Dennis Leeman || Dangerzone, Zonnehuis || Amsterdam, Netherlands || KO (Right cross) || 1 || 
|-  bgcolor="#CCFFCC"
| 2007-02-24 || Win ||align=left| Illias Chabrani Gym || Dodi Sports "Fight4Life" || Amsterdam, Netherlands || Decision (Unanimous) || 3 || 2:00
|-  bgcolor="#CCFFCC"
| 2007-02-10 || Win ||align=left| Mohamed Ayder || Beatdown IV || Amsterdam, Netherlands || Decision || 3 || 2:00
|-  bgcolor="#CCFFCC"
| 2006-10-15 || Win ||align=left| Joop Snijders || Top Team Beverwijk Muay thai gala || Beverwijk, Netherlands || Decision (Unanimous) || 3 || 2:00
|-  bgcolor="#FFBBBB"
| 2006-06-24 || Loss ||align=left| Yetkin Özkul || Kickbox gala Deventer || Deventer, Netherlands || TKO (Doctor stoppage) ||  || 
|-  bgcolor="#c5d2ea"
| 2006-03-18 || Draw ||align=left| Bilal Fiomar || Beatdown || Amsterdam, Netherlands || Decision draw || 3 || 2:00
|-  bgcolor="#CCFFCC"
| 2005-10-29 || Win ||align=left| Leroy de Veth || Kickboxgala Zonnehuis || Amsterdam, Netherlands || Decision || 3 || 2:00
|-  bgcolor="#CCFFCC"
| 2003-12-12 || Win ||align=left| Stanley Witteling || Team Karakura Muaythai & Freefight Gala || Katwijk, Netherlands || Decision || 2 || 2:00
|-
| colspan=9 | Legend:

See also 
List of It's Showtime events
List of It's Showtime champions
List of male kickboxers
List of male mixed martial artists

References

External links
 Blacklabelfighting (Dutch Language)
 Fighting Factory Carbin (Dutch Language)

1986 births
Living people
Dutch male kickboxers
Surinamese male kickboxers
Lightweight kickboxers
Surinamese Muay Thai practitioners
Surinamese emigrants to the Netherlands
ONE Championship kickboxers